Rudny (masculine), Rudnaya (feminine), or Rudnoye (neuter) is the name of several rural localities in Russia:
Rudny, Republic of Bashkortostan, a village in Tugaysky Selsoviet of Blagoveshchensky District of the Republic of Bashkortostan
Rudny, Belgorod Oblast, a settlement in Novooskolsky District of Belgorod Oblast
Rudny, Primorsky Krai, a settlement in Kavalerovsky District of Primorsky Krai
Rudny, Tula Oblast, a settlement in Kaznacheyevskaya Rural Administration of Shchyokinsky District of Tula Oblast
Rudnoye, Jewish Autonomous Oblast, a selo in Obluchensky District of the Jewish Autonomous Oblast
Rudnoye, Orenburg Oblast, a selo in Ivanovsky Selsoviet of Tyulgansky District of Orenburg Oblast
Rudnoye, Sverdlovsk Oblast, a selo in Irbitsky District of Sverdlovsk Oblast

See also
Rudnaya Pristan, a selo under the administrative jurisdiction of the town of Dalnegorsk, Primorsky Krai